Spear chucker or Spearchucker can refer to:

 An ethnic slur for people with African ancestry
 Spearchucker Jones, a character from the M*A*S*H film and television series
 Atlatl, the spear chucker